Birjhora Kanya Mahavidyalaya or Birjhora Girls' College  is the higher educational institution for women in Bongaigaon district of India's north eastern state of Assam and the study center which is   open for all under Krishna Kanta Handique State Open University (KKSHOU). The college is situated in the heart of Bongaiogaon city, an important commercial town in Lower Assam and the campus presents a unique and ideal educational atmosphere for all round development of the students.

History
The idea of gifting Bongaigaon an institute of higher education for women brought together a group of likeminded philanthropists and as a result of the combined efforts of these great people, Birjhora Kanya Mahavidyalaya was established in 1993. It is the first institute for higher education for women in Bongaigaon.
The college, which witnessed its journey with 50 students and 7 teachers,  has grown into an institute do excellence today. Since its inception, the institution has been striving hard to usher new dawn in the field of knowledge and wisdom of the state.

Courses
At present, the college offers H.S and Degree(Arts) & B.A. (degree) courses under AHSEC and Gauhati University respectively among various other courses such as B.B.A., B.M.C., D.L.Ed., etc. under Krishna Kanta Handique State Open University, as a study center.

Students offering major and general courses are to choose any one and two subjects respectively from the following:
 Economics
 History
 Education
 Political science
 Statistics
 Mathematics
 Advance Assamese
 Logic and Philosophy

References 

Women's universities and colleges in Assam
Colleges affiliated to Gauhati University
Educational institutions established in 1986
Colleges in Bongaigaon
1986 establishments in Assam